Jean Kuntzmann (1 June 1912 – 18 December 1992) was a French mathematician, known for his works in applied mathematics and computer science, pushing and developing both fields at a very early time.

Kuntzmann earned his Ph.D. in mathematics from the University of Paris under supervision of Georges Valiron.

In 1960, he established the École nationale supérieure d'informatique et de mathématiques appliquées de Grenoble.

References

.

External links
Jean Kuntzmann (1912-1992) Un extraordinaire pionnier 

1912 births
1992 deaths
20th-century French mathematicians
French computer scientists
University of Paris alumni
Academic staff of Grenoble Alpes University